The 2003–04 Kent Football League season was the 38th in the history of Kent Football League a football competition in England.

League table

The league featured 15 clubs which competed in the previous season, along with two new clubs:
Sevenoaks Town, joined from the Kent County League
Sporting Bengal United, joined from the London Intermediate League

League table

References

External links

2003-04
2003–04 in English football leagues